The Monon Trail (known as the Monon Greenway in Carmel) is a rail trail located entirely within the state of Indiana. The Monon Railroad was a popular railroad line connecting the cities of Chicago and Indianapolis, with stops at major settlements along its route. After the decline of railroad travel and the sale of the company in 1987, the portion of the line between Indianapolis and Delphi, Indiana, was abandoned.

In the Indianapolis area, the trail consists of  running through Hamilton and Marion counties, connecting Indianapolis, Carmel and Westfield. The trail has been extended to Sheridan, making the total length .

The first portions of the trail were created in the late 1990s, but it has been consistently extended in both of its segments since then. The trail is a shared use path complete with trailheads, park amenities and local attractions near it.

Northwest Indiana segment

In 2014, the trail was significantly extended, with a segment opening between Munster and Hammond. The segment connected a previously existing portion of the Monon Trail located entirely within Munster. The extension required the reconstruction of the old 1909 railroad bridge across the Little Calumet River, at a cost of approximately $1.5 million.

The Northern Indiana Commuter Transportation District, which operates the South Shore commuter rail service, is reconstructing a portion of the rail route along the old Monon right-of-way. The West Lake Corridor project was planned to provide service from southern Lake County communities to and from downtown Chicago; it is estimated to be completed in 2025.

Indianapolis segment

Plans to create a shared use trail on the former Monon right-of-way date back to the late 1980s. In 1999, a  segment in Indianapolis was completed, while a  segment in Carmel was opened between 2001 and 2002. The first phase of the trail cost approximately $5.5 million to create. 

In Indianapolis the Monon connects with the Central Canal Towpath along the Indiana Central Canal, and the Fall Creek Greenway. In Westfield, the trail provides access to the Midland Trace, Anna Kendall, and the Little Eagle Creek trails.

In the Indianapolis area, the Monon Trail is used by more than 1.3 million people annually. The trail has been cited as having a positive economic impact to neighborhoods adjacent to the trail, including Broad Ripple in Indianapolis and the mixed-use developments of downtown Carmel, which have experienced a large growth in population over the past decade.

The longest continuous stretch begins in Indianapolis at 10th street, and runs North, terminating in Grand Park of Westfield at 191st street. After reaching Grand Park, bikers can take country roads to reconnect with the trail at 216th street, where the trail picks back up and goes another  and ending in Sheridan. The final connection from 191st Street to 216th Street was completed in 2020.

Visitor attractions along the trail:
 Monon Depot Museum
 Carmel City Center
 Monon Community Center
 Indianapolis Art Center

References

External links

Maps
 
 

Official websites
 Bike the Monon
 
 

Video overview
 

Rail trails in Indiana
Bike paths in the Chicago metropolitan area
Tourist attractions in Indianapolis
Protected areas of Hamilton County, Indiana
Protected areas of Marion County, Indiana
Protected areas of Lake County, Indiana
Transportation in Hamilton County, Indiana
Transportation in Indianapolis
Transportation in Lake County, Indiana
1996 establishments in Indiana
National Recreation Trails in Indiana